Habibur Rahman (born 1 January 1967) is a Bangladeshi police officer. He has been an Additional IGP and head of the Tourist Police since 2022. Prior to that, he had been DIG of Dhaka Range since 2019, and was DIG (Administration and Discipline) at Police Headquarters, Dhaka before then.

Beside his police responsibilities, he is known for working for the betterment of underprivileged people of the country, especially trans women and water gypsies. Rahman is also the general secretary of the Bangladesh Kabaddi Federation and vice president of the Asian Kabaddi Federation.

Early life 
Rahman was born in 1967 at Chandro Dighulia in Gopalganj District, East Pakistan, Pakistan. He completed a master's degree from the Institute of Education and Research, University of Dhaka. He then took the Bangladesh Civil Service (BCS) examination and was selected for the police cadre. On 22 February 1998, he joined the Bangladesh Police as Assistant Superintendent of Police (ASP).

Career 
Rahman was a Dhaka District superintendent of police. On 23 February 2016, he was promoted to additional deputy inspector general. In 2018, he rose to deputy inspector general (DIG) of Administration and Discipline at police headquarters, Dhaka. He became DIG of Dhaka Range in 2019. Rahman was awarded the Bangladesh Police Medal (BPM) three times and President Police Medal (PPM) twice. In October 2022, he was promoted to the post of Additional IG.  

Rahman is one of the founders of the Bangladesh Police Liberation War Museum at Rajarbagh Police Lines, Dhaka.

In December 2012, when Rahman was Deputy Commissioner (Headquarters) of the Dhaka Metropolitan Police (DMP), he founded the Police Blood Bank. It operates out of the Central Police Hospital, Rajarbagh, where anyone, not only police, can donate blood. The blood is supplied to anyone in need, with priority given to donors.

To curb the illegal drug trade in Savar, Habib met with leaders of the Bede (snake charmer) community to discuss what could be done to rehabilitate families involved in the narcotics business. He involved Bedes in community policing and instituted training programs in driving, sewing, and computer use. He created economic opportunities for them and built roads, mosques, and schools for them and for trans women, another community neglected by society.

Rahman, through the Uttaran Foundation, which he established and chairs, has supported members of the transgender community starting their business ventures such as beauty parlors, diary farms, and tailors.

Rahman also founded an organization called Uttaran Foundation in 2017. Though it has informally been active since 2013. Habib also established a boutique house named “Uttaran Fashion” for underprivileged people.

Rahman became general secretary of the Bangladesh Kabaddi Federation in 2016. On 29 August 2018, he was elected vice-president of the Asian Kabaddi Federation.

Habib received International Mother Language Award - 2023 for his outstanding role on research collaboration on language.  His contribution to the collection of 'Thar' language, the almost extinct mother tongue of the Bede community.  

Habib is the producer of Deep Bay of Bengal, a Bengali language Bangladeshi movie based on ecological life on water, especially pollution of ecological system of the Bay of Bengal.

Books 
 .

References

External links 

 
 

People from Gopalganj District, Bangladesh
1967 births
University of Dhaka alumni
Bangladeshi police officers
Living people